Werner Abrolat (15 August 1924 – 24 August 1997) was a German actor best known for his role as various characters in the West German crime-drama television series Tatort.

After a long career at provincial theatres in West-Germany Abrolat appeared in a number of Spaghetti Westerns in the mid-1960s, such as a member of Indio's gang in the 1965 Sergio Leone film For a Few Dollars More.

In the early 1970s he made a number of films as a voice actor providing the voice for the character of Tjure in Vicky the Viking. He played Polizeipräsident in 00 Schneider – Jagd auf Nihil Baxter (1994). From the mid-1970s he mostly appeared in German films and German television until his death in 1997.

Filmography

References

External links
 

1924 births
1997 deaths
20th-century German male actors
German male film actors
German male television actors
German male voice actors
Male Spaghetti Western actors
People from East Prussia
People from Tilsit